Deborah Weems (February 1, 1950 - February 22, 1978) was an American actress and singer. She is best remembered for her recurring roles on the children's television program Captain Kangaroo.

Biography

Early life
Debbie Booth Weems was born in Houston, Texas to Benjamin and Rowene Weems. Debbie was the second of three girls. During her childhood her parents divorced and each remarried. A half-sister was born of her mother's second marriage. Two half-sisters and a stepsister were a part of her father's second marriage. Her mother and stepfather later relocated to Marlin Texas

During the 1960s, Weems attended the Interlochen Arts Academy in Michigan. She played a lead role in productions such as Annie Get Your Gun, The King and I, and The Miracle Worker, as well as smaller roles in many other productions. She also attended the Boston Conservatory of Music for two years ('68/'70) where she captured leading roles in two major productions - Carnival and Once Upon A Mattress. Weems later moved to New York City, where she appeared in an Off Broadway musical, Godspell. Weems was also a regular stock player at the Lakewood Musical Playhouse in Barnesville, Pennsylvania during 1971.  At Lakewood Debbie played Daisy in "On a Clear Day You Can See Forever," Princess Winnifred in "Once Upon a Mattress," Cleo in "The Most Happy Fella," and Meg Brockie in "Brigadoon."  She was originally scheduled to play the small role of Sally Cato in "Mame," but due to the sudden departure of the original leading lady, Debbie assumed the lead role of Mame with only one day of rehearsal before opening night. Weems also appeared in various commercials.

Captain Kangaroo
From 1973 to 1978, Weems appeared as a regular on the hit CBS daily children's series, Captain Kangaroo. In 1976, songs from the television series sung by Weems were released on an album, Debbie Weems Sings Songs from Captain Kangaroo, published by Wonderland Records. She was later featured in an article in the October 23, 1976 edition of TV Guide, called Don’t Tell Your Mom About Debbie, which was about her career on Captain  Kangaroo.

Final years

Weems suffered from typecasting, in which people always identified her as "that cute girl on Captain Kangaroo", hindering her ability to get roles for movies and TV shows geared toward the adult age group. During her tenure on the show, Weems' only other role during this time was in the 1977 movie Between the Lines, where she played a small role of "Annie One". 
Weems is believed to have suffered from anorexia and depression, shortly before her death, Weems was admitted to a residential treatment facility (The Country Place) in Connecticut.

Death
On February 22, 1978, Debbie committed suicide. Graveside funeral services were held at noon Saturday, February 25, 1978 at the family plot in Marlin, Texas. Her family and closest friends surrounded her at the funeral. The Reverend Allan Green, the Reverend H.B. Streater and the Rev. F.P. Goddard officiated. Debbie Weems was 28 years old.

Despite her death, episodes starring Weems continued to be televised through the summer of 1978.

References

Sources
 Bob Keeshan, Growing Up Happy

External links
 
 

1950 births
1978 suicides
American television actresses
American stage actresses
Female suicides
Actresses from Houston
People from Marlin, Texas
Suicides by jumping in New York City
Suicides by jumping in the United States
Suicides in New York City
Musicians from Houston
20th-century American actresses
20th-century American singers
20th-century American women singers